Devils of Darkness is a 1965 British horror film directed by Lance Comfort and starring William Sylvester, Hubert Noël and Carole Gray.

It was the last feature film directed by Lance Comfort.

Plot
A group of vampires and satanic worshippers led by Count Sinistre (who earlier in the film has claimed Tania, a local gypsy woman as his companion) seek fresh victims in a small town in Brittany inhabited by gypsies. Baxter is on holiday with a group of friends in this town. Count Sinistre returns with Tania after being accidentally resurrected to terrorise the townspeople on All Soul's Night, and murders three of Baxter's friends. Baxter, initially sceptical of the supernatural nature of the town, becomes suspicious and stays in town with a talisman belonging to Sinistre taken from the scene of one of the murders. Sinistre pursues Baxter in an attempt to recover the talisman and murders Baxter's acquaintances along the way.

Cast
 William Sylvester – Paul Baxter
 Hubert Noël – Count Sinistre
 Carole Gray – Tania
 Tracy Reed – Karen Steele
 Diana Decker – Madeleine Braun
 Rona Anderson – Anne Forest
 Peter Illing – Inspector Malin
 Gerard Heinz – Bouvier – the Hotel Manager
 Brian Oulton – The Colonel
 Walter Brown – Bruno
 Eddie Byrne – Dr. Robert Kelsey
 Victor Brooks – Inspector Hardwick
 Marie Burke – Old Gypsy Woman
 Marianne Stone – The Duchess
 Avril Angers – Midge

Reception

Author and film critic Leonard Maltin awarded the film two out of four stars, calling it "Intelligent, with great use of color, but flat, slow, and ultimately trivial."

References

External links

1965 films
1965 horror films
Films directed by Lance Comfort
Films shot at Pinewood Studios
British vampire films
1960s English-language films
1960s British films